Florin, Pennsylvania was known for being a stop off the Pennsylvania Railroad.  The Lancaster County, Pennsylvania populated place uses the zip code 17552.  The locality is located within East Donegal Township, Lancaster County, Pennsylvania.

References

Unincorporated communities in Lancaster County, Pennsylvania
Unincorporated communities in Pennsylvania